Ótta  (an old appellation for the time from 3 to 6 AM) is the fifth album by the Icelandic heavy metal band Sólstafir. It was released on August 29, 2014 through the record label Season of Mist. The tracks of the album represent the traditional Icelandic times of the day.

Track listing

Credits 
Writing, performance and production credits are adapted from the album liner notes.

Personnel

Sólstafir 
 Aðalbjörn Tryggvason – guitar, vocals
 Sæþór Maríus Sæþórsson – guitar
 Svavar Austmann – bass
 Guðmundur Óli Pálmason – drums

Additional musicians 
 Hrafn Thoroddsen – hammond organ on "Náttmál"
 Halldór Á. Björnsson – piano
 Bjarni M. Sigurðarson – banjo
 Amiina – strings
 Hildur Ársælsdóttir – strings
 Sólrún Sumarliðadóttir – strings
 María Huld Markan Sigfúsdóttir – strings

Production 
 Birgir Jón Birgirsson – production, mixing
 Aðalbjörn Tryggvason – production
 Silli Geirdal – co-production
 Níels Adolf Svansson – assistant engineering
 Andy Jackson – mastering

Artwork and design 
 Ragnar Axelsson – photography

Studios 
 Sundlaugin, Mosfellsbær, Iceland – recording
 Tube Mastering, Hertfordshire, England, UK

Charts

Notes

References

External links 
 

2014 albums
Season of Mist albums
Sólstafir albums